Hona Baghdad Satellite Channel is an Iraq-based satellite television channel broadcasting from Baghdad where its headquarters is located. Hona Baghdad programming includes: news programs, drama and comedy shows. Hona Baghdad gained popularity after air airing their political satire comedy show "Wilayat Batikh".

Availability 
The channel is available for its Arab audience throughout the world via satellite. Online streaming is available through its website.

References

External links 
 Official Website

Television networks in Iraq